The 2000 European Grand Prix (officially the 2000 Warsteiner Grand Prix of Europe) was a Formula One motor race held on 21 May 2000 at the Nürburgring in the German town of Nürburg in the state of Rhineland-Palatinate before 142,000 spectators. It was the sixth round of the 2000 Formula One World Championship and the ninth European Grand Prix in Formula One. Ferrari driver Michael Schumacher won the 67-lap race after starting from second place. Mika Häkkinen of the McLaren team finished in second and his teammate David Coulthard was third.

Michael Schumacher led the World Drivers' Championship entering the Grand Prix with his team Ferrari atop the World Constructors' Championship. Coulthard won the ninth pole position of his career by recording the fastest lap in qualifying. His teammate Häkkinen made a brisk getaway from third to take the lead into the first corner. He led the first ten laps until Michael Schumacher overtook him on lap 11. Heavy rain on lap 12 prompted the entire field to make pit stops and switch from the dry compound tyres to the wet-weather tyres. Michael Schumacher continued to lead until his second pit stop on lap 36, relinquishing it to Häkkinen for the next nine laps, after which the former regained the position. Michael Schumacher won the race, with Häkkinen 13.822 seconds behind in second, and Coulthard one lap adrift in third. It was Schumacher's fourth victory of the season, and the 39th of his career.

Due to the result of the race, Michael Schumacher extended his lead over Häkkinen in the World Drivers' Championship to 18 points. Coulthard remained in third place and he increased the gap by one point over the second Ferrari of Rubens Barrichello in fourth. In the World Constructors' Championship, Ferrari increased their lead to ten points from the second-placed McLaren. Williams remained in third notwithstanding the team scored no points as Benetton passed Jordan for fourth place with eleven races left in the season.

Background
The 2000 European Grand Prix was the sixth of the seventeen races in the 2000 Formula One World Championship and the ninth edition of the event as part of the series. It was held at the 13-turn  Nürburgring in the German town of Nürburg in the state of Rhineland-Palatinate on 21 May 2000. Sole tyre supplier Bridgestone brought the Soft and Extra Soft dry compound tyres as well as the soft and hard wet-weather compounds to the Grand Prix.

Going into the race, Ferrari driver Michael Schumacher led the Drivers' Championship with 36 points. His nearest rival was McLaren's Mika Häkkinen in second with 22 points and his teammate David Coulthard was a further two points behind in third. Rubens Barrichello in the second Ferrari was fourth with 13 points and Ralf Schumacher of the Williams team rounded out the top five with 12 points. In the Constructors' Championship, Ferrari (with 49 points) led McLaren by seven points. With 15 points, Williams stood in third. The Jordan and Benetton teams contended for fourth place.

After the Spanish Grand Prix on 7 May 2000, the teams conducted in-season testing to prepare for the event. The McLaren, Sauber, Benetton, Jordan, Arrows, British American Racing (BAR) and Williams teams opted to test at the Circuito de Jerez between 9 and 11 May. Coulthard missed the test to help him recover from three broken ribs he sustained in a plane crash at Lyon. His teammate Häkkinen was fastest on the first day of running and BAR driver Ricardo Zonta paced the second day's running. Alexander Wurz set the fastest lap on the final day for the Benetton team. The Prost team conducted three days of running at the Circuit de Nevers Magny-Cours with driver Nick Heidfeld to test the AP03's aerodynamic components. Luca Badoer spent three days at the Fiorano Circuit practicing pit stops and testing aerodynamic and mechanical setups of the F1-2000. Barrichello ran a new engine for the car and performed tyre testing at the Mugello Circuit.

Michael Schumacher won the season's first three races and had a healthy advantage over Häkkinen, who had reliability issues in the Australian and Brazilian races. Coulthard then won the British Grand Prix and Häkkinen the Spanish Grand Prix as Michael Schumacher had sub-par results at both of those races. Häkkinen said the gap was not extensive considering there were twelve races left in the season and that he was better able to handle pressure, "In this sport something weird always happens. If I were in Michael's shoes I would be getting a little bit worried at seeing us pick up two wins in a row – more than that, two 1–2 finishes." His teammate Coulthard said he would not allow his breaking three of his ribs to lose him momentum and hoped McLaren would finish first and second, "We are slowly chipping away at Michael's lead, but he has had this amazing run of luck and has finished every race in the points this season so it is still going to be difficult. But I am very confident, given my recent results, though it is still hard thinking about those six points I lost in Brazil when I was disqualified."

A total of 11 teams (each represented by a different constructor) fielded two race drivers each with no changes from the season entry list. Some teams made modifications to their cars for the European Grand Prix. Both Ferrari and McLaren fitted a revised aerodynamic package aimed primarily at improving their car's performance in the qualifying session. Ferrari brought a new engine called the 049B and installed smaller Brembo brake calipers and lighter disc pads. McLaren mounted cooling chimneys on both sides of the MP4-15 to facilitate in the disposal of heat. Williams brought new cast titanium uprights that the team elected not to use at the preceding Spanish Grand Prix. BAR ran its 002 cars with a new Honda engine and a revised version of its Xtrac-designed gearbox. Minardi installed a revised specification of front wing to their M02s following the completion of wind tunnel testing on it and the team continued to use a cast titanium transmission in Gastón Mazzacane's car.

Practice

A total of four practice sessions were held before the Sunday race, two one-hour sessions on Friday and two 45-minute sessions on Saturday. The Friday practice sessions were held in cool and variable weather. Overnight rain created a wet track that dried during the day. Michael Schumacher was fastest with a time of 1 minute and 21.092 seconds, followed by BAR's Jacques Villeneuve, the Jordan duo of Heinz-Harald Frentzen and Jarno Trulli, Barrichello, Coulthard, Zonta, Häkkinen and Pedro Diniz for Sauber in positions two to ten. During his final lap of the session, Häkkinen locked his tyres at the Dunlop Curve corner and got beached in the turn's gravel trap.

Rain fell between the conclusion of the morning session and the start of the afternoon session. It continued to fall at the north section of the track in the opening minutes of the second session before it dried and lap times improved sufficiently over the next 20 minutes. A light fuel load and a new set of tyres on his Williams FW22 meant Jenson Button recorded the day's fastest lap of 1 minute and 19.808 seconds with one minute of the session remaining. Wurz was 0.440 seconds slower in second. The McLaren pair of Häkkinen and Coulthard were third and fourth. Michael Schumacher, Ralf Schumacher, Trulli, Zonta, Heidfeld and Villeneuve followed in the top ten. An engine fault curtailed Ralf Schumacher's running and Giancarlo Fisichella of the Benetton team damaged the left-hand side of his car in a collision with a tyre barrier beside the circuit. Coulthard spun on a kerb at the Veedol chicane.

The weather was cold and overcast on Saturday morning. In the third practice session, Michael Schumacher set the fastest lap of 1 minute and 18.527 seconds, ahead of Häkkinen, Frentzen, Coulthard, Pedro de la Rosa of the Arrows team, Ralf Schumacher, Zonta, Villeneuve, Button and Barrichello. Arrows driver Jos Verstappen's running was curtailed after 17 minutes due to smoke billowing from his engine. Button hit the kerbs on the track, spun, and damaged his car against the tyre barrier.

Michael Schumacher did not improve his time; he remained the fastest driver in the fourth practice session. Barrichello in second was driving faster and he finished the session 0.227 seconds slower than his teammate. Häkkinen and Coulthard fell to third and fourth as Frentzen dropped to fifth. Fisichella improved to sixth, as the rest of the top ten comprised Villeneuve, Ralf Schumacher, De La Rosa and Trulli. During the session, Coulthard slid into a gravel trap at turn three though he rejoined the track without any apparent damage. He stopped at the side of the circuit at the Ford Kurve and track marshals extricated his car into an escape road. Marc Gené spun his Minardi car at the Castrol-S chicane and Ralf Schumacher drove into the grass after running deep at the Veedol chicane.

Qualifying

Saturday afternoon's one hour qualifying session saw every driver limited to twelve laps, with the starting order decided by their fastest qualifying laps. During this session the 107% rule was in effect, requiring each driver to remain within 107 per cent of the fastest lap time to qualify for the race. Sections of the circuit were damp from an earlier rain shower, and more rain was forecast, prompting teams to install the extra soft compound tyres on their cars and drivers ventured onto the track early in qualifying. A heavy rainstorm in the final 25 minutes prevented drivers from improving their lap times due to a slippery track. Every driver exited the pit lane with two minutes of qualifying left in order to try and get the maximum possible benefit of driving on a dry circuit. Coulthard took McLaren's first pole position in event history, his first since the 1998 Canadian Grand Prix and the ninth of his career with a lap of 1 minute and 17.529 seconds. He was joined on the grid's front row by Michael Schumacher who had the pole position until Coulthard's time and ran wide at the Ford Kurve. This formation continued on the second row with Häkkinen third after not feeling confident in the setup of his car and Barrichello took fourth after driver errors on his first two timed laps. Fifth-placed Ralf Schumacher was caught out by the change in conditions on a timed lap and went straight on at the Veedol chicane. Trulli, nursing a perforated eardrum, improved in the final minutes to go sixth, while Fisichella in seventh was delayed by Ralf Schumacher at the Coca-Cola Kurve. 

Jaguar's Eddie Irvine was baulked by one of the Prost cars en route to eighth as Villeneuve in ninth could not begin a fourth timed lap before qualifying ended. Frentzen qualified tenth as Jos Verstappen's Arrows car slowed his first timed lap. Button in 11th bemoaned venturing onto the track earlier than planned for his first timed lap and slower traffic hindered his final lap. A strategic error by the Arrows team meant De La Rosa was 12th and his teammate Verstappen 14th. They were separated by Heidfeld who fell from ninth to 13th in qualifying's final moments because he did not start a fourth timed lap. Wurz was caught out by the change in the weather and took 15th. Diniz in 16th mistimed a chance to begin his final timed lap and Johnny Herbert's Jaguar was 17th. Jean Alesi, who took 18th place, switched to the spare Prost setup for his teammate Heidfeld after his race car's electronic management system ceased the gearbox. He spun on the wet track and returned to the pit lane to retake his race car until the gearbox failed. Zonta qualified in 19th because his car's setup slowed him and another driver prevented him from setting his final timed lap because the session ended less than a second before he crossed the start/finish line. Sauber's Mika Salo was another driver who missed the cut-off time to set his final timed lap and was in 20th place. Slower traffic restricted Gené and his teammate Mazzacane to 21st and 22nd respectively.

Post-qualifying 
Heidfeld's car was found to be  under the minimum weight limit of  when it was pushed onto the weighbridge during qualifying. This translated into a performance gain of one-tenth of a second per lap but would not affect his qualifying result. The Prost squad were summoned to meet the stewards and accepted the car was underweight. The stewards disqualified Heidfeld from the race per Formula One's Technical Regulations. No appeal was filed by the Prost team.

Qualifying classification

Notes
 – Nick Heidfeld was found to have a car  underweight and was barred from the race.

Warm-up

A 30-minute warm-up session on Sunday morning took place in cool and dry weather. All drivers fine-tuned their race set-ups and set laps in their spare cars. Michael Schumacher went fastest in the session's closing seconds with a time of 1 minute and 20.251 seconds. Häkkinen was nine-thousands of a second slower in second. Frentzen, Barrichello, Verstappen, Coulthard, De La Rosa, Villeneuve, Irvine and Trulli completed the top ten. Towards the conclusion of the session, the left rear wheel on Fisichella's car detached and a track marshal retrieved it as it rolled onto the track.

Race
The race was held in front of a crowd of 142,000 from 14:00 local time. The weather at the start was overcast and dry with an 80% chance of rain. Every driver, except for Villeneuve, Verstappen, Barrichello and Michael Schumacher, began on the soft compound tyre. Coulthard was slow to react due to an unstable rear of his car; his teammate Häkkinen made a brisk getaway to drive in-between Coulthard and Michael Schumacher and take the lead going into the Castrol-S chicane. Villeneuve moved from ninth to fifth by driving on the outside. Ralf Schumacher turned left to draw alongside Villeneuve; the former held fourth place as Villeneuve went onto the grass. Further down the field, Trulli and Fisichella collided at the Castrol-S chicane, breaking Trulli's left-rear suspension and he stopped at the side of the track to retire. The two Arrows put Frentzen off the track at the same corner and allowing them and Diniz to pass. Going downhill to the Dunlop chicane, Ralf Schumacher attempted to pass Villeneuve for fifth; Villeneuve defended the position.

At the end of the first lap, Häkkinen led Michael Schumacher by 0.562 seconds, who in turn was 0.998 seconds ahead of Coulthard in third. Barrichello in fourth, was followed by Villeneuve in fifth and Ralf Schumacher in sixth. Michael Schumacher set the fastest lap at the time on lap two, completing a circuit in 1 minute and 22.438 seconds. On the same lap, De La Rosa overtook his teammate Verstappen to move into ninth and Alesi passed Button for 13th. Frentzen retired on lap three with smoke billowing from the rear of his car due to a piston sealing a gap between the engine's combustion chamber and crankcase failing. At the front, another fastest lap from Michael Schumacher lowered Häkkinen's advantage to 0.4 seconds. A lack of rear grip affected Coulthard's handling and the fourth-placed Barrichello pressured him. Villeneuve in fifth was distanced by the top four. On lap four, Ralf Schumacher was passed by Fisichella for sixth and De La Rosa overtook Irvine for eighth place. Fisichella drew close to Villeneuve in fifth as De La Rosa got ahead of Ralf Schumacher for seventh two laps later.

On the eighth lap, Michael Schumacher set the race's overall fastest lap, a 1-minute and 22.269 seconds as he used less of the track all round the lap than Häkkinen. Villeneuve made a driver error at the Veedol chicane on lap nine, and Fisichella used his better traction and car handling to steer right out of the turn and pass Villeneuve into the Coca-Cola Kurve. Light rain began to fall on the tenth lap. Cresting a hill to the Veedol chicane on lap 11, Michael Schumacher slipstreamed Häkkinen, and put him wide, making a pass to the left for the lead. Häkkinen lost traction and Michael Schumacher opened a lead of four-tenths of a second at the end of the lap. The rain intensity began to increase on the next lap and the track became slippery. Barrichello achieved a better exit coming out of the Coca-Cola Kurve and he overtook Coulthard for third on the start/finish straight. Further back, Irvine passed Ralf Schumacher at the Veedol chicane to move into eighth and Wurz was overtaken by Alesi for tenth. The rain made teams uncertain whether to stop for the wet-weather tyres though Herbert began the pit stop phase at the end of lap 12.

In clear air, Michael Schumacher extended his lead over Häkkinen to more than five seconds by the 13th lap. Gené spun onto the grass and damaged the front wing on the lap for which he entered the pit lane to have it replaced. Coulthard made his first pit stop on the next lap and Michael Schumacher and Häkkinen followed on lap 15. Both of their pit stops were problematic: Michael Schuamcher's refueller discovered no fuel had been inserted into the car for three seconds before resetting the fuel nozzle. Häkkinen's pit crew had difficulty fitting the right-rear wheel on his car and was stationary for an additional ten seconds. Michael Schumacher rejoined the race in front of Coulthard and Häkkinen fell to fifth. Coulthard turned left to attempt an overtake on Michael Schumacher into turn three to which the latter responded by blocking Coulthard's path. Barrichello led one lap before his pit stop on lap 16 and Ralf Schumacher followed suit. Because he spent longer on the wet track on the dry compound tyres than his teammate, Barrichello emerged in ninth and Michael Schumacher regained the lead. On the 19th lap, Fisichella drove right to pass De La Rosa going downhill to the Dunlop-Kurve hairpin for fourth and repelled the latter's manoeuvre to retake the position.

By the 20th lap, Häkkinen was the fastest driver on the track and he reduced the gap to Michael Schumacher by two seconds per lap as his teammate Coulthard lost seven seconds to the latter. Coulthard went to the left of the Veedol chicane and allowed his teammate Häkkinen to move into second on the next lap. Michael Schumacher lost control of his car at the Veedol chicane on lap 22 and retained the lead. Further back, Barrichello overtook Verstappen, Irvine and Ralf Schumacher to return to fifth place by lap 23. Two laps later, Ralf Schumacher passed Herbert for ninth. On lap 28, a driveshaft failure on Salo's car caused him to lose control of his car and he retired in a gravel trap. Verstappen overtook Irvine on the outside at the exit to the Coca-Cola Kurve for seventh at the end of lap 29. Irvine attempted to retake the position by out-braking Verstappen into the Castrol-S chicane. He lost rear grip past the apex and slid into the side of Verstappen's car. As Irvine rotated in front of Ralf Schumacher, the latter spun into the rear of the Jaguar. Ralf Schumacher spun onto the grass and Irvine's rear wing detached at turn three. The loss of downforce beached Irvine in the gravel trap, as Verstappen spun and crashed against the right-side tyre barrier exiting the Ford Kurve.

Further up the field, Barrichello caught and overtook Fisichella into the Veedol chicane for fourth on lap 32. He entered the pit lane on the next lap as the technical director of Ferrari Ross Brawn switched Barrichello to a three-stop strategy to better recover positions on dry tyres on a wet track. Michael Schumacher made a pit stop on lap 35 for enough fuel to finish the race. Häkkinen took the lead on lap 36 as Schumacher emerged in second. He increased the lead to 25.6 seconds by lap 40 since Michael Schumacher had a heavily fuelled car. Three laps later, Alesi overtook Wurz for tenth. Häkkinen had delayed his second pit stop for ten laps; he was unable to build up a lead large enough because of slower traffic and was leading by 21.9 seconds by lap 44. He and his teammate Coulthard made their final pit stops on lap 45, and rejoined in second and fifth respectively. With their pit stops complete, Michael Schumacher led Häkkinen by 12.5 seconds with the yet-to-stop De La Rosa third. Villeneuve was told to enter the pit lane from fifth on lap 46. He was retired because his team detected via telemetry an engine fault linked to a valve issue. De La Rosa made his stop on the 48th lap, elevating Barichello to third and Coulthard to fourth. On that lap, Gené retired with a failed accelerator throttle.

On lap 49, Button was duelling with Herbert and ran into the rear of Herbert's car at the slow Veedol chicane, creating a hole in the leading edge of the Williams' front wing that Button was unable to notice; both drivers remained on the circuit and continued. Barrichello made the race's final pit stop on lap 51. Barrichello gained seven seconds on Coulthard; the gap was not large enough for Barrichello to retain third and he fell to fourth. Three laps later, Zonta's rear wheels locked under braking and he spun into a gravel trap and then beached upon a kerb. On lap 61, Wurz out-braked Button going uphill towards the Veedol chicane for tenth. Entering the Coca-Cola Kurve on the next lap, Wurz went to the right of Herbert, who remained wide to provide Wurz with space to negotiate through. Wurz was  faster and he collided with Herbert. Both cars pirouetted through 180 degrees into a gravel trap. Wurz retired as Herbert continued until he spun through 180 degrees for a second time before retiring. Their retirements elevated Button to seventh. He remained there until enough water penetrated the hole in his front wing and caused a sudden electrical fault that cut out the engine on lap 65.

Häkkinen followed 13.822 seconds later in second due to his being slowed by him overtaking slower cars and his teammate Coulthard was one lap behind in third, nursing a mechanical issue. Barrichello was close to Coulthard in fourth. Fisichella took fifth and De La Rosa registered Arrows' first points-scoring finish of 2000 in sixth. Diniz gained eight places from his starting position of 15th to finish seventh notwithstanding pirouetting three times early in the race. Mazzacane had an untroubled race and progressed from 21st to eighth. Alesi was the final finisher after gearbox problems meant he made four pit stops and entailed a ten-second stop-and-go penalty due to a faulty pit lane speed limiter button on his steering wheel that caused him to violate the  pit lane speed limit. The attrition rate was high, with 9 of the 21 starters finishing the race.

Post-race
The top three drivers appeared on the podium to collect their trophies and spoke to the media in a later press conference. Michael Schumacher said that none of the leaders made pit stops on lap 12 because they did not want to install the wet-weather tyres and discover they were slower than the slick dry compounds, "We knew [the heavy rain] would come, but nobody had any idea whether it would start then or later. So obviously it was difficult. Then some drivers started to come in for rain tyres, and as soon as we saw they were faster we went straight in too." Häkkinen said his start from third to the lead was one of the best of his career, "[When you're third on the grid] that's the only chance to get through. You can immediately improve your position, and I was happy to do it because the disappointment I had in qualifying was fixed." Coulthard spoke of his feeling that he was fortunate to have finish third and called it "one of my most difficult race" due to a lack of grip at the rear of his car, "But I knew from following other cars myself that visibility was very bad. So I just concentrated on driving my car and waiting to see where I would finish when it was over."

Barrichello said he was disappointed to take fourth because he felt he could have finished on the podium, "Three-stops was definitely the way to make up lost time, but it was very difficult to overtake other cars in the spray. I have been looking forward to a close fought-race for some time now, and maybe I should have been on the podium today." De La Rosa scored his first points of the season and achieved his best finish since the 1999 Australian Grand Prix. The Arrows team owner Tom Walkinshaw said the driver's sixth-place finish would produce "a good foundation for the team to aspire to do better", and De La Rosa stated the result made up a poor start of the season, "We will try now, we will have to do it. I had some very good first laps and was always with the group but not because of drivers going out – this was just a deserved point." Wurz apologised to Herbert for the collision between the two at the Coca-Cola Kurve in the race's final laps. Frentzen called the event "a very disappointing weekend all round" for him and that "things have just not gone our way – and that is frustrating when you know your car is competitive."

Irvine argued the three-car collision at the Castrol-S chicane on lap 30 lost him an opportunity to score points and Verstappen echoed similar feelings. Ralf Schumacher said he could not avoid the accident, "I saw the accident coming between Jos and Eddie and I expected them both to slide off onto the inside. But as Irvine's back end moved right in front of me, I had no way of getting out of the way." The new gap between Michael Schumacher and Häkkinen in the Drivers' Championship stood at 18 points in the former's favour. Coulthard was in third place with 24 points and moved a point clear from Barrichello in fourth. Ralf Schumacher remained in fifth with 12 points. In the Constructors' Championship, Ferrari moved a further three points in front of McLaren. Williams retained third place as Benetton passed Jordan in the battle for fourth with eleven races left in the season.

Race classification
Drivers who scored championship points are denoted in bold.

Championship standings after the race

Drivers' Championship standings

Constructors' Championship standings

Note: Only the top five positions are included for both sets of standings.

References

European Grand Prix
European Grand Prix
European Grand Prix
May 2000 sports events in Europe